Bariton may refer to:
 Baryton, a string instrument
 Baritone (French: baryton; German: Bariton; Italian: baritono) is most commonly the type of male voice that lies between bass and tenor. 
 Baritone guitar, a six string electric guitar tuned in a low B instead of E.
 Baritone horn, a member of the brass family of instruments

See also
 Baritone (disambiguation)